Eric Lu (born December 15, 1997) is an American classical pianist. Hailed by The Guardian as a pianist with "the magic touch of...Murray Perahia and Radu Lupu", he won the gold medal at the Leeds International Piano Competition in 2018 at age 20. He records for Warner Classics under an exclusive contract, and has performed with many of the world's major orchestras including the Chicago Symphony Orchestra, BBC Philharmonic, Royal Liverpool Philharmonic, Seattle Symphony, and Orchestre national de Lille; upcoming debuts include appearances as soloist with the Boston Symphony Orchestra and the London Symphony Orchestra.

Early life and education
Eric Lu was born on December 15, 1997, in Massachusetts to a father from Kaohsiung, Taiwan, and a mother from Shanghai, China. He grew up in Bedford, Massachusetts, and started piano studies at age six with Dorothy Shi in the Boston area. Later on, he enrolled at the New England Conservatory Preparatory School, where he studied with Alexander Korsantia and A. Ramon Rivera. In 2013, he was admitted into the Curtis Institute of Music in Philadelphia, where he studied with Jonathan Biss and Robert McDonald. He is also a pupil of Dang Thai Son.

Career 
In October 2015, Lu won the 4th prize at the 17th International Fryderyk Chopin Piano Competition in Warsaw, Poland at the age of 17, becoming one of the youngest laureates in the history of the competition. Shortly afterwards, he performed his debut at the 70th International Chopin Festival in Duszniki, Poland. He went on a tour of Japan and Korea with the Warsaw Philharmonic along with the other prizewinners of the competition in January 2016. 

In 2017, Lu won the International German Piano Award in Frankfurt. He also won the audience prize.

In 2018, at age 20, Lu won the First Prize and gold medal at the Leeds International Piano Competition. He was the first American pianist to do so since Murray Perahia. He played Beethoven Piano Concerto No. 4 in the finals with the Hallé Orchestra conducted by Edward Gardner. After winning, he was immediately signed by Askonas Holt and Warner Classics. His first concert after winning Leeds was a debut with the Royal Liverpool Philharmonic Orchestra and Vasily Petrenko. Subsequent notable debuts have included recitals at Wigmore Hall, Amsterdam Concertgebouw, Louis Vuitton Foundation in Paris, Saint Petersburg Philharmonia, and Shanghai Grand Theatre. His UK recital debut in Bristol was praised by The Guardian: 'Lu seems already to possess something of the magic touch of early Leeds laureates Murray Perahia and Radu Lupu'. In June 2019, Lu replaced Martha Argerich in a concert with the Singapore Symphony Orchestra. Lu made his debut at the 2019 BBC Proms at London's Royal Albert Hall with the Shanghai Symphony Orchestra and Yu Long.

Awards

 2010 - XII Ettlingen International Competition for Young Pianists (Germany) - 1st Prize
 2013 - III Minnesota International e-Piano Junior Competition - 1st Prize, and Schubert Prize
 2014 - IX Moscow International Fryderyk Chopin Competition for Young Pianists - 1st Prize
 2015 - IX US National Chopin Competition - 1st Prize, and prize for best performance of a Concerto
 2015 - XVII International Fryderyk Chopin Piano Competition in Warsaw, Poland - 4th Prize
 2017 - VII International German Piano Award, Frankfurt, Germany - 1st Prize and FAZ-Audience-Award
 2018 - Leeds International Piano Competition - 1st Prize, Terence Judd–Hallé Orchestra Prize

References

External links
 Polskie Radio- Eric Lu

American classical pianists
Male classical pianists
American male pianists
1997 births
Prize-winners of the International Chopin Piano Competition
American people of Chinese descent
American people of Taiwanese descent
21st-century classical pianists
Curtis Institute of Music alumni
Living people
21st-century American pianists
21st-century American male musicians